Julián Stiven Horta Acevedo (born 15 August 1999) is a Colombian Greco-Roman wrestler. He won the 2020 Pan American Wrestling Olympic Qualification Tournament in the 67 kg category, thus qualifying for the 2020 Summer Olympics. He competed in the 67 kg event.

He won the bronze medal in his event at the 2022 Bolivarian Games held in Valledupar, Colombia. He competed in the 67 kg event at the 2022 World Wrestling Championships held in Belgrade, Serbia. He won the gold medal in his event at the 2022 South American Games held in Asunción, Paraguay.

Achievements

References

External links
 

1999 births
Living people
Colombian male sport wrestlers
Olympic wrestlers of Colombia
Wrestlers at the 2020 Summer Olympics
Pan American Wrestling Championships medalists
21st-century Colombian people
Competitors at the 2022 South American Games
South American Games gold medalists for Colombia
South American Games medalists in wrestling